Her Husband Lies is a 1937 American drama film directed by Edward Ludwig and written by Wallace Smith and Eve Greene. The film stars Gail Patrick, Ricardo Cortez, Akim Tamiroff, Tom Brown, Louis Calhern and June Martel. The film was released on March 13, 1937, by Paramount Pictures.

Plot

Cast 

Gail Patrick as Natalie Martin
Ricardo Cortez as J. Ward Thomas
Akim Tamiroff as Big Ed Bullock
Tom Brown as 'Chick' Thomas
Louis Calhern as Joe Sorrell
June Martel as Betty Thomas
Dorothy Peterson as Dorothy Powell
Ralf Harolde as Steve Burdick
Adrian Morris as Carwig
Ray Walker as Maxie
Jack La Rue as Trigger
Bradley Page as Pug
Paul Fix as Lefty Harker

References

External links 
 

1937 films
American black-and-white films
1930s English-language films
Paramount Pictures films
American drama films
1937 drama films
Films directed by Edward Ludwig
1930s American films